Chartwell may refer to:

Chartwell, near Westerham, Kent, England, the former home of Sir Winston Churchill
Chartwell, Hamilton, New Zealand
Chartwell Shopping Centre
Chartwell, Wellington, a suburb of Wellington City, New Zealand
Chartwell, Gauteng, a suburb of Johannesburg, South Africa
Chartwell Leisure, an American hotel company
Chartwell Court, a residential tower block in Brighton, England
Chartwell Mansion, Bel-Air, California, United States
Chartwell Retirement Residences, seniors' housing provider in Canada
Chartwell Technology, a software developer
Chartwells, a division of Compass Group

See also